Abacetus nigerrimus is a species of ground beetle in the subfamily Pterostichinae. It was described by Straneo in 1948.

References

nigerrimus
Beetles described in 1948